David Alexander Eimer is a journalist and author.  Eimer is a former foreign correspondent for The Daily Telegraph covering China and for the South China Morning Post covering Southeast Asia.

Career
Eimer is a former correspondent in southeast Asia and China for the Sunday Telegraph, working there from 2007 to 2012.

Books

A Savage Dreamland
A Savage Dreamland; Journeys in Burma (Bloomsbury 2019) is about Burma, a country Eimer explores though historical and scholarly sources, in interviews, and by travel to parts of the country rarely seen by tourists.

The Emperor Far Away
The Emperor Far Away: Travels at the Edge of China (Bloomsbury 2014).

Personal life
Eimer lives in Bangkok, Thailand.

References

British journalists
Living people
The Daily Telegraph people
Year of birth missing (living people)